Federal Highway 115 (Carretera Federal 115) is a Federal Highway of Mexico. The highway travels from Ixtapaluca, State of Mexico in the north to Izúcar de Matamoros, Puebla in the south. Federal Highway 115 is co-signed with Mexican Federal Highway 160 from Izúcar de Matamoros to north of Cuautla in Cuautlixco, Morelos.

References

115